John Oliver (born 12 January 1943) is a British sprint canoer who competed from the late 1960s to the mid-1970s. He was eliminated in the semifinals of the K-4 1000 m event at the 1968 Summer Olympics in Mexico City. Four years later in Munich, Oliver was eliminated in the repechages of the K-4 1000 m event and in the semifinals of the K-1 1000 m event. At his third and final Summer Olympics in Montreal, he was eliminated in the semifinals of the K-4 1000 m event.

References
Sports-reference.com profile

1943 births
Canoeists at the 1968 Summer Olympics
Canoeists at the 1972 Summer Olympics
Canoeists at the 1976 Summer Olympics
Living people
Olympic canoeists of Great Britain
British male canoeists